Stanowisko , is a village in the administrative district of Gmina Giby, within Sejny County, Podlaskie Voivodeship, in north-eastern Poland, close to the borders with Belarus and Lithuania.

It is the nearest village to the BYLTPL tripoint that lies to the SE and is reached through forest tracks.

References

Stanowisko